Exclusive  (simplified Chinese: 独家追辑) is a 2008 Malaysian Chinese-language drama television series. It was co-produced by Double Vision and ntv7, and was broadcast every Monday to Thursday, at 9:45 pm on Malaysia's ntv7 channel.

Cast
Berg Lee
Yise Loo
Alvin Wong
Mayjune Tan
Monday Kang

External links
Newsroom Capers - STAR

References

Chinese-language drama television series in Malaysia
2008 Malaysian television series debuts
2008 Malaysian television series endings
NTV7 original programming
Television series about journalism